Crazy Nights is a music VHS by American glam metal band Kiss. The VHS features three videos from the album of the same name. It included the music videos for "Crazy Crazy Nights", "Turn on the Night" and "Reason to Live". It was certified Gold in the US.

Track listing

References

External links
 Kiss Online

Kiss (band) video albums
Music video compilation albums
1991 video albums
1991 compilation albums